Società Sportiva Chieti Calcio is an Italian association football club, based in Chieti, Abruzzo. Currently it plays in Serie D.

History

Foundation

Chieti was founded in 1922 as Calcio Chieti with a capital of 50 cents. The First World War had just ended, the football came from the distant echo of the successes of Pro Vercelli, Novese, Milan, Inter, Juventus, Genoa and so on. One day in the Villa Comunale, Nicola De Cesare tossed with some friends, the idea of forming a football team. It joined other people with the sum of £0.50 was paid the dues and was born RISS. The RISS played in the first few games against teams in the central Civitella military. The enthusiasm for sport was rising huge. Existed in the same year the Sport Club Chieti, who for many years not doing any sport, it was decided therefore to a large rise in Chieti association football. There was a meeting between the RISS, Novell and Sport Cub Chieti and Chieti was formed with the U. S. President Carlo Massangioli.

Chieti played 2005/2006 in Serie C1/B, ending last-placed and being therefore relegated to Serie C2 for the next season. The team was however cancelled by the federation because of financial troubles.

Refoundation
A new club, named A.S.D. Chieti, asked to be admitted to play Promozione (7th level of Italian football), claiming Article 52 of N.O.I.F. Chieti gained promotion to Serie D in 2008. Since 2010–11 season, S.S. Chieti Calcio plays in Lega Pro Seconda Divisione.

In 2012–13, the team was playing at the fourth tier of Italian football, managing to get to the promotion playoffs, after securing a draw in the last matchday against Arzanese. The goalscorer that sealed the qualification of the team to the playoffs was Massimiliano Barbone, a defender

Colors and badge
The team's colours are green and black.

The choice of black and green Theatines date back to 1919, the year in which the first soccer team representing the City did not have their uniforms, so in lack of money to buy it was necessary to the seals of Venezia Calcio found in a crate from the Venice along with many other documents containing the registry office and more, transferred to Chieti to Edict of King Vittorio Emanuele III to prevent the seizure by the Austro-Hungarian troops in case of invasion of the Veneto after Kobarid. The pennant team has undergone various tweaks over the years. Was recently identified by a crest style AC Milan, then under the leadership of President Antonio Buccilli, we moved to a more modern pennant depicting two strips (one black and one green) cross the words "DC 1922" i.e. Chieti Calcio 1922. In 2006, following the failure of the pennant 'ASD Chieti rudimentary style has been reinvented AS Roma. The last change was made in the summer of 2008 when the previous emblem was added to one side the 'Achilles' horse, symbol of the city of Chieti and just, therefore, also the local team.

Stadium

The stadium Stadio Guido Angelini was designed in 1969 and became operational in May 1970 with a friendly Chieti-Milan arbitrated by the great Concetto Lo Bello, all with a frame of about 11,000 spectators. In the first 9 years of the stadium has been named "Marrucino".

Players

Notable players

Emiliano Di Marcantonio

Italian internationals
Enrico Chiesa
Fabio Grosso (Italian World Cup Winner, spent three seasons from 1998 to 2001)
Fabio Quagliarella

References

External links
Official Club Website 

Football clubs in Abruzzo
Chieti
Association football clubs established in 1922
Serie C clubs
1922 establishments in Italy